Joan Anita Nabirye (born 25th September 2000) is a Ugandan professional  footballer who plays as a midfielder for Kenyan Women's Premier League club Vihiga Queens FC, and the Uganda women's national team.

International goals
Scores and results list Uganda goal tally first

References

External links 
 

Living people
Ugandan women's footballers
Uganda women's international footballers
Women's association football midfielders
1993 births